Ainu rebellion may refer to several wars between the Ainu and Wajin peoples in Japanese history:
 Koshamain's War (1457)
 Shakushain's revolt (1669-1672)
 Menashi–Kunashir rebellion (1789)